Białuń  (formerly )  is a village in the administrative district of Gmina Stara Dąbrowa, within Stargard County, West Pomeranian Voivodeship, in north-western Poland.

The village has a population of 359.

References

Villages in Stargard County